Gilsivan Soares da Silva (born 12 December 1984), commonly known as Ivan, is a Brazilian footballer who plays as a goalkeeper for Santo André.

Career statistics

Club

Notes

References

1984 births
Living people
Brazilian footballers
Association football goalkeepers
Grêmio Catanduvense de Futebol players
Esporte Clube XV de Novembro (Jaú) players
Operário Ferroviário Esporte Clube players
Joinville Esporte Clube players
Paysandu Sport Club players
Goiás Esporte Clube players
Associação Chapecoense de Futebol players
Esporte Clube Santo André players
Campeonato Brasileiro Série D players
Campeonato Brasileiro Série C players
Campeonato Brasileiro Série B players